Kuro may refer to:

A common Japanese nickname.

A dark color (Black)

People with the given name
, Japanese samurai 
, Japanese theatre director

Fictional characters
 Kuro (One Piece), a character in One Piece
 Kuro Kagami, a character in Kodomo no Jikan
 Kuro Neko, a character in Agustin Guerrero

Film and television
 Kuro Arirang, a 1989 South Korean film
 Kuro (film), a 2012 film
 Kuroshitsuji or Kuro, an anime which some fans call Kuro for short
 Kuro no Tenshi, a list of films with the name

Places
 Kurõ, a village in Rõuge Parish
 Mount Kuro (disambiguation)
 Kuroshima (disambiguation) or Kuro Island
 Kuro, Pakistan, a village in Ghanche District, Pakistan

Other
 Pioneer Kuro, a line of televisions by Pioneer Corporation
 "Kuro", an episode of Ao no Exorcist

See also 
 Kuuro, American DJ and electronic music producer
 Kuros (disambiguation)
 
 KuroKy, German-Iranian professional player
 Kuro5hin, discussion website

Japanese masculine given names